= Official PlayStation Magazine =

Official PlayStation Magazine may refer to one of several magazines:

- Official U.S. PlayStation Magazine, a U.S. magazine by Ziff Davis
- PlayStation: The Official Magazine, a U.S. magazine by Future Publishing
- PlayStation Official Magazine – Australia, an Australian magazine by Media Factory Pty. Ltd
- PlayStation Official Magazine – UK, a UK magazine by Future Publishing
- Official PlayStation Magazine (Ireland), an Irish magazine by TP Media
